Melisende was a popular French name in the Middle Ages, and may refer to:

 Melisende, Queen of Jerusalem (1105–1161), Queen regnant of the Kingdom of Jerusalem
 Melisende, Viscountess of Châteaudun (died before 1040)
 Melisende of Arsuf (born before 1177), French noblewoman
 Melisende of Lusignan (1200–after 1249), Princess of Antioch
 Melisende of Montlhéry, grandmother of Melisende of Jerusalem
 Melisende of Piquigny, possible mother of Godfrey de Saint-Omer (11th–12th century)
 Melisende of Tripoli (fl. c. 1160), Cousin of the King of Jerusalem

See also 
 
 Melisande (disambiguation)
 Millicent (disambiguation)